Maripanus quadrimaculatus is a species of beetle in the family Cerambycidae, the only species in the genus Maripanus.

References

Compsocerini